Sweets from a Stranger is a 1987 Italian thriller film directed and co-written by Franco Ferrini. The film is about a serial killer targeting sex workers. The women decided to band together to protect themselves , but their efforts are only partially successful as the killer continues their killing spree. As the police investigate, the sex workers group together to try and find some leads on their own.

Ferrini got the idea for the film while writing the film Red Rings of Fear (1978). It was produced with a budget of 2 billion Italian lire. Retrospective reviewers commented on if the film should be considered a proper giallo, noting it's subdued nature and attempts at Social realism, while noting it's reveal of the killer and violent scenes relate it to the other gialli.

Plot 
In Rome a maniac kills several sex workers, torturing them with a razor. Soon they are informed that the murderer kills the victims not only with a razor, but delivers the deathblow to them with a bolt gun. Stella, a luxury call girl, learns about the murder of Bruna, a fellow streetwalker and old friend. Only Bruna's colleagues attend the funeral. Nadine, an experienced sex worker with a cheerful but tenacious personality, decides to organize a group of her fellow prostitutes in order to protect themselves and to discover the identity of the serial killer before he strikes again.

Cast 
Cast adapted from So Deadly, So Perverse Volume 2.

Production
Directo Franco Ferrini got the idea for Sweets From a Stranger while scripting the film Red Rings of Fear (1978). Ferrini stated he was inspired by Fritz Lang's film M (1931) for the film.

It was shot with a budget of 2 billion Italian lire.

Style
In his book Blood & Black Lace, Adrian Luther-Smith described the film as a "subdued thriller with social realism at its core.", while saying "it's clearly a giallo and the revelation of the killer's identity is suitably ridiculous" Troy Howarth, in his book So Deadly, So Perverse stated the films giallo elements are "somewhat muted" and that the film "in some respects more of a social document than a proper thriller, but it warrants inclusion [in his book giallo] for its novel variation on a standard formula."

Release and reception
Sweets From a Stranger is released in 1987. Film critic and historian Roberto Curti described the audience and critical reception to the film as being "cold to say the least".  From a contemporary review in Corriere della sera, a reviewer stated "for our part, we think Ferrini went way over his head."

From retrospective reviews, Howarth stated that "emphasis on the social aspect of the film will likely be off-putting for some more thrill hungry viewers" while stating that "Ferrini paces the material wery well and the actors all give very credible performances" noting that "Ferrini ensures that the film is engaging as both a drama and a thriller." Luther-Smith stated that "despite [Ferrini]'s best intentions, I would rather sit through [Ferrini-scripted Rings of Fear] ten times than watch this docu-drama again." Curti stated that the film was an uneasy mixture of violence, patronizing character study, and weak dialogue.

References

Sources

External links

1987 films
Giallo films
1980s Italian films
Films about prostitution in Italy
Italian thriller films
1987 thriller films
1987 drama films